Solidarity is the eighth studio album by Australian rock music singer-songwriter, Richard Clapton. It was released in Australia in September 1984 It peaked at No. 27 on the Kent Music Report Albums Chart.

Track listing

Charts

Release history

References 

1984 albums
Richard Clapton albums
albums produced by Mark Opitz
Mushroom Records albums